Single Album is the fourteenth studio album by the American punk rock band NOFX, released on February 26, 2021. It is the band's first studio album in nearly five years, since 2016’s First Ditch Effort, marking the longest gap between two NOFX studio albums; between 2016 and 2021, however, the band did release a series of one-off singles and a split album West Coast vs. Wessex (2020), which saw NOFX cover five Frank Turner songs. The album was originally going to be released as a double album, but the COVID-19 pandemic prompted the band to release just a single album, hence the title. Fat Mike has further elaborated that the intended second disc of the album didn't receive positive feedback and thus it was scrapped.

Overview
"Fish in a Gunbarrel" was initially released digitally in 2019, whereas "I Love You More Than I Hate Me" and "Doors and Fours"—along with other songs that did not make the album—were released sporadically throughout 2020 as a reaction to COVID-19-related lockdowns in California.

Three music videos have been released for the album. The video for "I Love You More Than I Hate Me" takes place at a house party where all four band members commit suicide in various ways only to be ignored by the rest of the party. The video features The Bombpops standing in for NOFX and playing the song. The video for "Doors and Fours" consists mostly of archive footage of the early 1980s L.A. hardcore scene that NOFX originated from. The music video Linewleum - a sarcastic reinterpretation of "Linoleum" from Punk in Drublic—features Avenged Sevenfold playing the song, as well as footage of numerous local bands covering "Linoleum". A second video released shortly after consists solely of footage of more bands covering the song.

Critical reception
Kerrang!s David McLaughlin scored the release 4/5, stating: "If your mind was made up about NOFX years ago, Single Album is unlikely to change it, but even if this isn't essential for everyone, it is for the band's troubled leader". Carys Hurcom of Wall of Sound gave the album an 8/10, writing: "Anyone who refuses to listen to NOFX beyond the late 1990's, will be disappointed—some fans will take a while to adapt to the musical variety while others will appreciate the diversity."

Track listing

Personnel
NOFX
 Fat Mike – lead vocals, bass
 Eric Melvin – guitar, background vocals
 El Hefe – guitar, background vocals
 Smelly – drums

Additional personnel
 Jason Livermore – production, mastering, mixing, engineering
 Bill Stevenson – production, engineering
 Chris Beeble – engineering
 Sergie Loobkoof – artwork
 Jon Weiner – photography

Charts

References

2021 albums
NOFX albums
Fat Wreck Chords albums
Albums produced by Bill Stevenson (musician)